This list is a below in the form of day-by-day summaries:

Day 1 (23 May)

In the Men's singles many of seeded players made it through led by 2009 finalist Robin Söderling, Mikhail Youzhny and Marin Čilić. While Jo-Wilfried Tsonga was pushed to the limit by German Daniel Brands as he came through 7–5 in the fifth. Tsonga was joined by compatriots Édouard Roger-Vasselin, Josselin Ouanna and Julien Benneteau who upset 23rd seed Ernests Gulbis 6–4, 6–2, 1–0 as Gulbis retired with a hamstring injury.

In the Women's side 6th seed and defending champion Svetlana Kuznetsova cruised through the first round with a 6–3, 6–1 victory of Sorana Cîrstea. She was joined by 2nd seed Venus Williams, Madrid champion Aravane Rezaï, Nadia Petrova, Flavia Pennetta, Maria Kirilenko and last years Semifinalist Dominika Cibulková. The day featured two upsets. Victoria Azarenka, hindered by an injury and only appeared in the event to have entered to claim the bonus prize money for ending the 2009 season in the top 10, became the first major casualty of the tournament as she was upset by Gisela Dulko. Rome champion María José Martínez Sánchez was also upset by Akgul Amanmuradova.
 Seeds out:
 Men's Singles:  Ernests Gulbis
 Women's Singles:  Victoria Azarenka,  María José Martínez Sánchez
Schedule of Play

Day 2 (24 May)
In the Men's Singles World no. 1 and defending champion Roger Federer cruised past Peter Luczak with a 6–4, 6–1, 6–2 victory. He was joined by Indian Wells champion Ivan Ljubičić, Miami finalist Tomáš Berdych, Stanislas Wawrinka, John Isner and Thomaz Bellucci. While World no. 3 Novak Djokovic, last years semifinalist Fernando González, Gaël Monfils and Victor Hănescu all won in 4. While world no. 4 Andy Murray took on Richard Gasquet and won 4–6, 6–7, 6–4, 6–2, 6–1. 29th seed Spaniard Nicolás Almagro also needed five sets to defeat Robin Haase. The upsets of the day saw Spanish clay courters Feliciano López and Tommy Robredo both fall.

In the Women's draw 6 of the top 8 seeds were in action and all won. The field was led by World no. 1 Serena Williams who beat Stefanie Vögele 7–6, 6–2. She was joined by Caroline Wozniacki, Jelena Janković, Elena Dementieva, Samantha Stosur and Agnieszka Radwańska. Other seeds Li Na, Kateryna Bondarenko, Alisa Kleybanova and Lucie Šafářová who defeated Jelena Dokić all won in straight sets. While Francesca Schiavone and Alona Bondarenko come back from a set down to get to the second round.
 Seeds out:
 Men's Singles:  Feliciano López,  Tommy Robredo
Schedule of Play

Day 3 (25 May)
Day 3 of action was led by 4-time champion and 2nd seed  Rafael Nadal who defeated Gianni Mina 6–2, 6–2, 6–2. Nadal was joined by fellow Spaniards 7th seed Fernando Verdasco, 16th seed Juan Carlos Ferrero, 9th seed David Ferrer and Pere Riba. Other seeds who went through were German Philipp Kohlschreiber, Austrian Jürgen Melzer and former world no. 1 Lleyton Hewitt. While 6th seed Andy Roddick who was playing his first match in clay of the season needed 5 sets to get past Jarkko Nieminen 6–2, 4–6, 4–6, 7–6, 6–3. Upsets were not avoided as two seeds fell in 4. As 18th seed Sam Querrey lost to compatriot Robby Ginepri and 26th seed clay courter Juan Mónaco was upset by Grega Žemlja.

In the Women's Singles almost all seeds got through in straight sets led by Justine Henin who beat Tsvetana Pironkova 6–4, 6–3, in her 1st match at RG for 3 years. She was joined by unseeded compatriots Kirsten Flipkens and Yanina Wickmayer, as well as Russians Maria Sharapova, Vera Zvonareva and Anastasia Pavlyuchenkova. Other seeds Daniela Hantuchová, Shahar Pe'er, Zheng Jie and Frenchwoman Marion Bartoli all won. The second major upset of the tournaments came at the cost of 2-time finalist Dinara Safina, who was upset by 39-year-old Kimiko Date-Krumm 3–6, 6–4, 7–5.
 Seeds out:
 Men's Singles:  Juan Mónaco,  Sam Querrey
 Women's Singles:  Dinara Safina
Schedule of Play

Day 4 (26 May)
World no. 1 Roger Federer dispatched Colombian Alejandro Falla in straight sets. Other straight sets victors were Robin Söderling, Jo-Wilfried Tsonga, Marin Čilić, Tomáš Berdych, Stanislas Wawrinka and Albert Montañés. While Mikhail Youzhny progressed in four after losing the first set tie-break. The only upset of the day was when Thiemo de Bakker defeated 32nd seed Guillermo García-López. The end of the day saw lots of matches being suspended and cancelled due to rain delays. One of those matches was between Frenchman Gaël Monfils and Italian Fabio Fognini which descended into chaos as they played on despite extreme darkness for 2 games, before finally coming off court a full 25 minutes after Murray and Chela's match did, at 5–5 in the 5th.

World no. 2 Venus Williams led the days games in the women's side with a 6–2, 6–4 victory over Arantxa Parra Santonja, she was joined by Caroline Wozniacki, Flavia Pennetta, Nadia Petrova, Alexandra Dulgheru and Maria Kirilenko who all won straight sets. While Dominika Cibulková and Aravane Rezaï scrambled to win in three. One of the stories of the day was with defending champion Russian Svetlana Kuznetsova against German Andrea Petkovic, who served for the match in the 2nd set, but the Russian survived 4–6, 7–5, 6–4. As with the Men's side several matches were cancelled.
 Seeds out:
 Men's Singles:  Guillermo García-López
 Women's Singles:  Lucie Šafářová
 Men's Doubles:  Eric Butorac  /  Rajeev Ram,  Robert Lindstedt /  Horia Tecău
Schedule of Play

Day 5 (27 May)
 Seeds out:
 Men's Singles:  Gaël Monfils
 Women's Singles:  Kateryna Bondarenko,  Agnieszka Radwańska,  Vera Zvonareva
Schedule of Play

Day 6 (28 May)
 Seeds out:
 Men's Singles:  Marcos Baghdatis,  Fernando González,  John Isner,  Albert Montañés
 Women's Singles:  Dominika Cibulková,  Alexandra Dulgheru,  Svetlana Kuznetsova,  Li Na,  Zheng Jie
 Men's Doubles::  Simon Aspelin /  Paul Hanley,  Marcel Granollers /  Tommy Robredo
 Women's Doubles:  Vera Dushevina /  Ekaterina Makarova
 Mixed Doubles:  Yan Zi /  Mariusz Fyrstenberg
Schedule of Play

Day 7 (29 May)
 Seeds out:
 Men's Singles:  David Ferrer,  Juan Carlos Ferrero,  Victor Hănescu,  Lleyton Hewitt,  Philipp Kohlschreiber,  Ivan Ljubičić,  Andy Roddick
 Women's Singles:  Marion Bartoli,  Alona Bondarenko,  Alisa Kleybanova,  Anastasia Pavlyuchenkova,  Aravane Rezaï,  Yanina Wickmayer
 Men's Doubles::  Mahesh Bhupathi /  Max Mirnyi,  Bob Bryan /  Mike Bryan,  Mardy Fish /  Mark Knowles
 Mixed Doubles:  Liezel Huber /  Mahesh Bhupathi,  Lisa Raymond /  Wesley Moodie,  Bethanie Mattek-Sands /  Mark Knowles
 Schedule of Play

Day 8 (30 May)
 Seeds out:
 Men's Singles:  Marin Čilić,  Andy Murray,  Jo-Wilfried Tsonga,  Stanislas Wawrinka
 Women's Singles:  Maria Kirilenko,  Flavia Pennetta,  Maria Sharapova,  Venus Williams
 Men's Doubles:  František Čermák /  Michal Mertiňák
 Women's Doubles:  Iveta Benešová /  Barbora Záhlavová-Strýcová,  Cara Black /  Elena Vesnina,  Olga Govortsova /  Alla Kudryavtseva,  Andrea Hlaváčková /  Lucie Hradecká,  Alisa Kleybanova /  Francesca Schiavone,  Bethanie Mattek-Sands /  Yan Zi,  Lisa Raymond /  Rennae Stubbs
Schedule of Play

Day 9 (31 May)
 Seeds out:
 Men's Singles:  Thomaz Bellucci,  Fernando Verdasco
 Women's Singles:  Daniela Hantuchová,  Justine Henin,  Shahar Pe'er
 Men's Doubles:  Julien Benneteau /  Michaël Llodra,
 Women's Doubles:  Gisela Dulko /  Flavia Pennetta,  Maria Kirilenko /  Agnieszka Radwańska,  Nadia Petrova /  Samantha Stosur,  Chan Yung-jan /  Zheng Jie
 Mixed Doubles:  Alisa Kleybanova /  Max Mirnyi
Schedule of Play

Day 10 (1 June)
This day, Roger Federer lost his quarterfinals match against Robin Söderling, making it the first time since the 2004 French Open that Federer did not reach at least the semifinals of a Grand Slam tournament. It also meant that Federer lost his ATP men's single No. 1 ranking in tennis since Rafael Nadal won the 2010 French Open men's singles title. Also, since Nadal became the 2010 French Open men's singles champion, Federer was left only one week short of equalling Pete Sampras's record number of 286 weeks as the ATP No. 1 ranked men's singles player.

 Seeds out:
 Men's Singles:  Roger Federer,  Mikhail Youzhny
 Women's Singles:  Nadia Petrova,  Caroline Wozniacki
 Men's Doubles:  Mariusz Fyrstenberg /  Marcin Matkowski,  Łukasz Kubot /  Oliver Marach
 Mixed Doubles:  Cara Black /  Leander Paes
Schedule of Play

Day 11 (2 June)
This day decided the last two of the four semifinalists in the women's singles. Since none of the four semifinalists (Samantha Stosur, Jelena Janković, Francesca Schiavone, and Elena Dementieva) had won any Grand Slam women's singles titles before, this meant Francesca Schiavone became a first-time women's singles Grand Slam champion in this tournament.

 Seeds out:
 Men's Singles:  Nicolás Almagro,  Novak Djokovic
 Women's Singles:  Serena Williams
 Women's Doubles:  Liezel Huber /  Anabel Medina Garrigues,  Nuria Llagostera Vives /  María José Martínez Sánchez
 Mixed Doubles:  Nuria Llagostera Vives /  Oliver Marach
Schedule of Play

Day 12 (3 June)
 Seeds out:
 Women's Singles:  Elena Dementieva,  Jelena Janković
 Men's Doubles:  Wesley Moodie /  Dick Norman,  Julian Knowle /  Andy Ram
 Schedule of Play

Day 13 (4 June)
 Seeds out:
 Men's Singles:  Tomáš Berdych,  Jürgen Melzer
 Women's Doubles:  Květa Peschke /  Katarina Srebotnik
Schedule of Play

Day 14 (5 June)
 Seeds out:
 Women's Singles:  Samantha Stosur
 Men's Doubles:  Lukáš Dlouhý /  Leander Paes
Schedule of Play

Day 15 (6 June)
Rafael Nadal reclaimed the No. 1 men's singles ATP ranking, leaving Roger Federer only one week short of equalling Pete Sampras's record number of 286 weeks as the ATP No. 1 ranked men's singles player. This win is also the first time since the French Open 2004 that Roger Federer was knocked out by a player who hasn't won a grand slam tournament.

 Seeds out:
 Men's Singles:  Robin Söderling
Schedule of Play

References

Day-by-day summaries
French Open by year – Day-by-day summaries